is a Japanese football player for MIO Biwako Shiga.

Club statistics
Updated to 23 February 2016.

References

External links

Profile at Oita Trinita

1996 births
Living people
Association football people from Hyōgo Prefecture
Japanese footballers
J1 League players
J3 League players
Japan Football League players
Vissel Kobe players
Oita Trinita players
AC Nagano Parceiro players
MIO Biwako Shiga players
Association football defenders